Govind Singh Rajpurohit is an Indian legal educational administrator. He is Head & Dean in Department of Law University of Rajasthan. He is alumni of University of Rajasthan. He has been distinguished invitees, Chief Guest, Guest of honor in various universities, member of various committees in UGC. He is also member of statutory body, General Council of National Law University, Jodhpur.

Career 
He started teaching in 1999 Baba Mungipa College of Law, Maharshi Dayanand Law College, Sanjay College of Law, S.S. Jain Subodh Law College. He previously worked as Head & Dean in Jagan Nath University, Jaipur, Rajasthan. He has restructured curriculum of various universities and organized seminars, conferences and moot courts. He has been associated with UGC, UPSC, various universities of India in various capacities. Ten books and 65 research papers and book reviews, and many treatise are to his credit. He is on the Board of editors of many national and international journals of repute and active member of various international professional bodies like.

Research 
He completed his Ph.D. in 2003. Numerous research papers are in his credit. He is in Editorial Advisory Board of Law Research Journals. He has guided many Ph.D. students.

Books

References

Living people
Academic staff of the University of Rajasthan
Place of birth missing (living people)
1967 births
Indian legal scholars
20th-century Indian educational theorists
Indian academic administrators
Writers from Rajasthan
20th-century Indian educators
University of Rajasthan alumni
Legal educators
Rajasthani people
Deans of law schools in India
Scholars from Rajasthan